Alonso Jiménez Prieto (born September 19, 1987) is a Mexican footballer who plays for Charlotte Eagles in the USL Pro.

Career
Jimenez played with Mexican club Indios from 2007 until when they folded in 2011. He later trialled with USL PDL club West Texas Sockers and signed with them on April 27, 2012.

Jimenez joined USL Pro club Charlotte Eagles in April 2013.

References

1987 births
Living people
Mexican expatriate footballers
Mexican footballers
Indios de Ciudad Juárez footballers
Club Tijuana footballers
Midland-Odessa Sockers FC players
Charlotte Eagles players
Association football goalkeepers
People from Ciudad Juárez
Sportspeople from Chihuahua (state)
Expatriate soccer players in the United States
Liga MX players
USL League Two players
USL Championship players